Potassium channel subfamily K member 6 is a protein that in humans is encoded by the KCNK6 gene.

This gene encodes K2P6.1, one of the members of the superfamily of potassium channel proteins containing two pore-forming P domains. K2P6.1, considered an open rectifier, is widely expressed. It is stimulated by arachidonic acid, and inhibited by internal acidification and volatile anaesthetics.

See also
 Tandem pore domain potassium channel

References

Further reading

External links 
 

Ion channels